Gardens of Memory Cemetery may refer to:
 Gardens of Memory Cemetery (Minden, Louisiana)
 Woodlawn Garden of Memories Cemetery, a cemetery in Houston, Texas